Adrien Stoutenburg (December 1, 1916 – April 14, 1982) was an American poet and a prolific writer of juvenile literature. Her poetry collection Heroes, Advise Us was the 1964 Lamont Poetry Selection.

Life 
Stoutenburg was born in Darfur, Minnesota. Following her father's death in 1918, she was raised by her paternal grandmother in Hanley Falls, Minnesota. She finished high school in Minneapolis, and attended the Minneapolis School of Art from 1936 to 1938.

She then worked as a librarian and in other capacities near Richfield, Minnesota. In 1943, she published her first book of children's fiction, The Model Airplane Mystery. Stoutenburg later wrote, "After publishing in many magazines, I seriously settled down to writing books in 1951. She had published four books of children's fiction by 1956, when she moved to California to become an editor at Parnassus Press, a publisher of children's literature. She held the position at Parnassus Press until 1958. Over her career, Stoutenburg published about forty books of juvenile fiction and non-fiction. Several of the works were co-authored with Laura Nelson Baker, with whom Stoutenburg lived, in Lagunitas, California. Stoutenburg also published under the pseudonyms Barbie Arden, Lace Kendall, and Nelson Minier (the latter jointly with Baker, e.g. The Lady in the jungle). At least five of Stoutenburg's books were Junior Literary Guild selections. Only one of her works, American Tall Tales, is currently in print; upon its publication in 1966, the New York Times included it on a listing of recommended volumes for children, summarizing it as "Eight tales, tough, sentimental, and bold, about American's folk heroes ...".

Stoutenburg's first volume of poetry, Heroes, Advise Us, was the 1964 Lamont Poetry Selection of the Academy of American Poets; each year, this award honored and supported one poet's first published book. Her second collection, A Short History of the Fur Trade, won a California Book Award (silver) for 1969, and was a close competitor for the Pulitzer Prize. Her third collection, Greenwich Mean Time, was published in 1979. James Dickey has written of her poetry, "If I were to characterize the tone of voice, I would call it that of sensitive outrage, quivering, powerful, and delicate. Delicate: therefore powerful..."

Stoutenburg died of cancer in 1982 in Santa Barbara, California. At Stoutenburg's request, David R. Slavitt subsequently edited and published a selection of her poetry. The volume, Land of Superior Mirages, includes a number of poems that had been unpublished at her death. In his review, Robert von Hallberg wrote, "Adrien Stoutenburg's poems deserve much more attention than they have received." Some of Stoutenburg's papers, and also those of Laura Nelson Baker, are archived at the University of Minnesota Children's Literature Research Collection.  Papers relating to Stoutenburg's career as a poet are housed at The Bancroft Library at the University of California, Berkeley.

Stoutenburg's poems were selected for nine volumes of the annual Borestone Mountain Poetry Awards, and have been included in several more recent anthologies. One common selection is her poem "Cicada", originally published in 1957 in The New Yorker.

Works

Poetry collections
1964 "The Things That Are". Reilly & Lee, (Chicago).  (Illustrated by Robert Lostutter)
1964 Heroes, Advise Us. Scribner (New York, NY).
1969 A Short History of the Fur Trade. Houghton (Boston, MA).
1979 Greenwich Mean Time. University of Utah Press (Salt Lake City, UT). .
1986 Land of Superior Mirages: New and Selected Poems. David R. Slavitt, editor; James Dickey, introduction. Johns Hopkins University Press (Baltimore, MD). .

Young-adult fiction
1954 The Silver Trap
1958 Honeymoon
1959 Four on the Road
1960 Good Bye, Cinderella (Westminster)
1964 Walk Into the Wind
1971 Out There ("The first major novel of ecological nightmare", from the cover)

Children's fiction and poetry
1943 The Model Airplane Mystery (Doubleday Doran)
1951 Timber Line Treasure (Westminster)
1955 Stranger on the Bay (Westminster)
1956 River Duel (Westminster)
1957 In This Corner (Westminster)
1957 Snowshoe Thompson (with Laura Baker Nelson; illustrated by Victor De Pauw) (Scribner)
1961 The Blue-Eyed Convertible (Westminster)
1961  (Lace Kendall, pseud.; illustrated by Sam Savitt)
1962 Window on the Sea (Westminster)
1962  (Lace Kendall, pseud.; illustrated by Douglas Howland)
1963 A Time For Dreaming (Westminster)
1963 The Mud Ponies: Based on a Pawnee Indian Myth (Lace Kendall, pseud.; illustrated by Eugene Fern) (Coward-McCann, New York)
1964 The Things That Are (poetry; illustrated by Robert Lostutter)
1965 Rain Boat (Lace Kendall, pseud.; John Kaufmann, illustrator; Coward-McCann). Stoutenburg called it "One of my favorite books".
1966 American Tall Tales (Richard M. Powers, illustrator) (Puffin, 1976).
1966 The Crocodile's Mouth: Folk-song Stories (Glen Rounds, illustrator) (Viking)
1968 American Tall-Tale Animals (Glen Rounds, illustrator; Viking)
1969 Fee, Fi, Fo, Fum: Friendly and Funny Giants (Rocco Negri, illustrator) (Viking, 1969)
1971 Haran's Journey (Laszlo Kubinyi, illustrator; Dial)
1971 A Cat Is (poetry; photographs by Sy Katzoff) (Franklin Watts, New York)
1972 The Giant Who Sucked His Thumb (illustrated by Shyam Varma) (Deutsch, London)
1978 Where To Now, Blue? (Four Winds Press)

Non-fiction
1958 Wild Animals of the Far West (Ruth Robbins, illustrator; Parnassus Press)
1958 Wild Treasure, The Story of David Douglas (with Laura Nelson Baker)
1959 Scannon: Dog with Lewis and Clark (with Laura Nelson Baker)
1960  (under the pseudonym Lace Kendall) 
1961 Beloved Botanist: The Story of Carl Linnaeus (with Laura Nelson Baker)
1961  (under the pseudonym Nelson Minier)
1963 Dear, Dear Livy: The Story of Mark Twain's Wife (with Laura Nelson Baker)
1963  (under the pseudonym Lace Kendall)
1965 Explorer of the Unconscious: Sigmund Freud
1966  (under the pseudonym Lace Kendall)
1967 A Vanishing Thunder: Extinct and Threatened American Birds
1968 Animals at Bay: Rare and Rescued American Wildlife
1968  (under the pseudonym Lace Kendall)
1968 Listen, America: A Life of Walt Whitman (with Laura Nelson Baker; Scribner's)
1971

References

External links 
  Biography of Stoutenburg, and links to some of her poems and other writings.
 
  1943–1986
 Laura Nelson Baker at LC Authorities, with 27 records 1943–1971 (including 2 "from old catalog")
  – 8 works by Stoutenburg using the pseudonym

1916 births
1982 deaths
20th-century American poets
American children's writers
American women poets
People from Watonwan County, Minnesota
Writers from Minnesota
American women children's writers
Poets from Minnesota
20th-century American women writers